Arturo Escobar may refer to:

Arturo Escobar (anthropologist), Colombian American anthropologist
Arturo Escobar y Vega, Mexican politician